The Rural Municipality of Invergordon No. 430 is a rural municipality (RM) in the Canadian province of Saskatchewan within Census Division No. 15 and  Division No. 5. It is located west of the City of Melfort.

History 
The RM of Invergordon No. 430 incorporated as a rural municipality on December 11, 1911.

Geography

Communities and localities 
The following urban municipalities are surrounded by the RM.

Organized hamlets
Crystal Springs
Meskanaw
Tway

Special service areas
Yellow Creek

Localities
Tarnopol
Tiger Hills
Waitville

Demographics 

Government 
The RM of Invergordon No. 430 is governed by an elected municipal council and an appointed administrator that meets on the second Wednesday of every month. The reeve of the RM is Bruce Hunter while its administrator is Courtney Beaulieu. The RM's office is located in Crystal Springs.

Transportation 
Highway 41—serves Meskanaw
Highway 20—intersects  Highway 41
Highway 320—intersects Highway 20

References 

I

Division No. 15, Saskatchewan